Nitin or Nithin (Devanagari: नितिन, नीतीन, or नीतिन) is a male first name in India and Nepal.

Notable people named Nitin

 Nitin Bose, Indian film director
 Nitin Dubey, Indian Singer and actor from Chhattisgarh
 Nitin Chandrakant Desai, Bollywood art director and production designer
 Nitin Gadkari, Indian Transport minister, former President of the Bharatiya Janta party
 Nitin Ganatra, British actor
 Nitin Kapoor, Indian producer
 Nitin Mukesh, Indian singer
 Neil Nitin Mukesh, Indian actor
 Nitin Nohria, American business writer
 Nitin Pradhan, former Chief Information Officer for the US Department of Transportation
 Nitin Rakesh, businessman
 Nitin Raut, Indian politician
 Nitin Saini, Cricket batsman
 Nitin Sahrawat, actor
 Nitin Sathya, Indian actor
 Nitin Sawhney, Indian-British composer and musician
 Nitin Gadkari. Indian minister of road and transport

See also
 Nithiin (born 1983), Indian film actor and producer predominantly in Telugu cinema

References

Indian masculine given names